In Greek mythology, Piasus (Ancient Greek: Πίασος), also known according to the Suda as Piasos the Thessalian, was the father of Larisa, wife of Cyzicus, king of the Doliones.

Mythology 
Strabo only gives an account pertaining Piasus in his book, Geography:It is at the Phryconian Larisa that Piasus is said to have been honored, who, they say, was ruler of the Pelasgians and fell in love with his daughter Larisa, and, having violated her, paid the penalty for the outrage; for, observing him leaning over a cask of wine, they say, she seized him by the legs, raised him, and plunged him into the cask. Such are the ancient accounts.

Notes

References 

 Strabo, The Geography of Strabo. Edition by H.L. Jones. Cambridge, Mass.: Harvard University Press; London: William Heinemann, Ltd. 1924. Online version at the Perseus Digital Library.
 Strabo, Geographica edited by A. Meineke. Leipzig: Teubner. 1877. Greek text available at the Perseus Digital Library.
 Suida, Suda Encyclopedia translated by Ross Scaife, David Whitehead, William Hutton, Catharine Roth, Jennifer Benedict, Gregory Hays, Malcolm Heath Sean M. Redmond, Nicholas Fincher, Patrick Rourke, Elizabeth Vandiver, Raphael Finkel, Frederick Williams, Carl Widstrand, Robert Dyer, Joseph L. Rife, Oliver Phillips and many others. Online version at the Topos Text Project.

Larissa
Incest in Greek mythology
Mythological rapists
Incestual abuse
Characters in Greek mythology